MLCC is an initialism that may refer to:

Computers and electronics
 Micro lead-frame chip carrier, a type of package for integrated circuits
 Multi-layer ceramic capacitor, a surface-mount type of ceramic capacitor
 Machine Learning Crash Course, see

Other uses
 Manitoba Liquor Control Commission, a former Crown agency of the government of Manitoba, Canada
 Marx and Lenin Communist Circle, original name of the French political group Democratic Communist Circle
 Merrill Lynch Credit Corporation, a division of Merrill Lynch
 , the French term for local currency

Miscellaneous
 Mesoamerican Long Count calendar, the Mayan or Mesoamerican Long Count Calendar